Luke Ford (born 8 March 1988) is a Welsh rugby union player who plays Centre (rugby union)for Neath RFC and was once part of the Cardiff Blues squad.

He is the son of Wales international rugby player, Steve Ford.

Notes

1988 births
Living people
Welsh rugby union players
Rugby union fly-halves